Road routes in South Australia assist drivers navigating roads in urban, rural, and scenic areas of the state. Today, all numbered routes in the state are allocated a letter (M, A or B) in addition to a one, two or three digit number, denoting different levels of significance. The route system includes officially designated highways, urban freeways and arterial roads, and other important cross-state roads that have not been declared highways.

History 
Route numbers have been allocated to South Australia's roads since 1955, with the introduction of National Routes across all states and territories in Australia, symbolised by a white shield with black writing; National Route 1 ('Highway 1') was one of the best-known numbered national routes, due to its fame for circumnavigating the continent.

In 1974, the National Highway network was defined, which allowed some existing National Routes to be upgraded to National Highways. These were marked with the same shield design as the National Routes, except for their gold-on-green colouring and the word NATIONAL added across the top. Unlike many other states, South Australia never adopted State Routes, although it allowed two Victorian rural State Routes to cross the border and terminate in locations within 20km of it when they were rolled out there in 1985.

In 1998, the state replaced its system of National Routes and National Highways with an alphanumeric route numbering system. Many existing numbered routes were allocated a letter (M, A or B) in addition to its number, with 'M' routes denoting freeways, 'A' routes denoting routes of state significance, and 'B' routes denoting routes of local significance. Instead of shields, route numbers are displayed as yellow text on green rectangular backgrounds, and has now become the sole route numbering system in the state. The changeover to alphanumeric routes was carried out from 1998 either by removing old "shield" coverplates installed on newer signs, or installing new alphanumeric coverplates on old shielded signs, adopting the same design as Victoria (which adopted its alphanumeric system a year previous). Trailblazers were introduced with alphanumeric routes in Adelaide's metropolitan area and the tourist areas of Victor Harbour and the Barossa Valley in 1998, with allocations extended to cover country areas in 1999. Former National Highways still retained their shield design (including NATIONAL markings) after conversion, but were modified in 2017 to remove them, bringing their design in line with the rest of the state.

Alphanumeric Routes
All alphanumeric routes listed here are derived from the Government of South Australia's Location SA service.

M routes
Roads allocated an M route are usually at least dual-carriageway motorways or expressways, with at least two lanes in each direction. These roads keep traffic moving and are likely to have no traffic lights and higher speed limits.

A routes
Roads allocated an A route are main or arterial routes providing a high standard of driving conditions both across single- or dual-carriageway roads, linking to and from M roads and provide access to major towns and places of interest across metro and regional SA.

B routes
Roads allocated a B route are secondary or local arterial roads, These roads link to and from A and M roads and provide access to places of interest across metro and regional SA.

C routes
Roads allocated a C route are major collector roads, linking local roads and streets to the arterial road network for inter-state travel.

While officially gazetted C routes exist in South Australia, these are currently based on existing Victorian C routes terminating in South Australian locations just inside the SA/VIC state border, and do not exist anywhere else in the state.

R routes
Roads allocated a R route are for ring roads, provide a path around a city, rather than travelling through it.

South Australia is currently the only state in the country to use R routes. To date, there is only one R route: around Adelaide, the state's capital city.

Former Routes

National Routes
National Routes were the first type of route numbering to be attempted in Australia on a large scale, signed with a white shield and black writing (similar in shape to the shield that appears on the Australian coat of arms), with South Australia receiving routes in 1955. They highlighted the interstate links connecting major population, industrial and principal regions of New South Wales to the rest of the Australia, in a way that was readily identifiable to interstate travellers. The system was prepared by COSRA (Conference of State Road Authorities), held between 1953–1954: once each state road authority agreed to the scheme, it was rolled out federally.

Selected routes were later upgraded into National Highways when the National Roads Act was passed in 1974.

South Australia's National Routes were eventually replaced with the alphanumeric system, introduced across the state between 1998–1999: each route was converted to an alphanumeric route number, rendering the black-and-white shield redundant. Most National Routes in rural South Australia kept their number during the conversion; two exceptions were National Route 47 (which became B83), and National Route 83 (which became B80, B82 and B83).

National Highways
With the passing of the National Roads Act in 1974, selected National Routes were further upgraded to the status of a National Highway: interstate roads linking Australia's capital cities and major regional centres that received federal funding, and were of higher importance than other National Routes. These new routes were symbolised by green shields with gold writing, and the word "National" along the top of the shield. Most of South Australia's National Highways were declared in 1974 and their shields converted in the following years, with National Highway 20 later declared in 1992.

Like National Routes, South Australia's National Highways were also replaced with the alphanumeric system, introduced across the state in 1998: each route was converted to an alphanumeric route number, all keeping their number during the conversion, but also initially keeping the National green-and-gold shield design; this was eventually eliminated in 2017.

State Routes (from Victoria)
South Australia never adopted State Routes, but allowed two Victorian rural State Routes to cross the border and terminate in South Australian locations within 20km of it when they were rolled out there in 1985; these were replaced by their Victorian equivalent alphanumeric allocations in 1998.

See also

List of road routes in the Australian Capital Territory
List of road routes in New South Wales
List of road routes in the Northern Territory
List of road routes in Queensland
List of road routes in Tasmania
List of road routes in Victoria
List of road routes in Western Australia
List of highways in South Australia

References

 01
R
South Australia
.Road routes
Road routes